Earcandy Six is the debut studio album from Swedish heavy metal band Black Ingvars. It was released in 1995.

Track listing
 "De sista ljuva åren"
 "Inget stoppar oss nu"
 "Två mörka ögon"
 "Gråt inga tårar"
 "Tiotusen röda rosor"
 "Mitt eget Blue Hawaii"
 "Eloise"
 "Leende guldbruna ögon"
 "Dra dit pepparn växer"
 "Flamingomedley"
Hon är sexton år idag (Happy Birthday Sweet Sixteen)
Kärleksbrev i sanden (Love Letters in the Sand)
Tintarella di luna
Nu är det lördag igen (Another Saturday Night)
Eviva España
 "I natt är jag din"

Charts

References 

1995 debut albums
Black Ingvars albums
Swedish-language albums